The 1982 Boston College Eagles football team represented Boston College as an independent during the 1982 NCAA Division I-A football season. The Eagles were led by second-year head coach Jack Bicknell, and played their home games at Alumni Stadium in Chestnut Hill, Massachusetts. Sophomore quarterback Doug Flutie threw for over 2,700 yards, leading Boston College to the 1982 Tangerine Bowl, their first bowl game since 1942.

Schedule

Roster

References

Boston College
Boston College Eagles football seasons
Boston College Eagles football
Boston College Eagles football